The ISA World Surfing Games, formerly known as the ISA World Surfing Championships, are organized by world governing body of surfing, the International Surfing Association (ISA), which is recognized by the International Olympic Committee.

Editions
The event was known as the ISF World Surfing Championships between 1964 and 1972. After that, a World Pro--Am Surfing Championship was created that favored a world circuit of events (which is now the World Surf League. The event resurged in 1978 as the ISA World Surfing Championships and has been known as the ISA World Surfing Games since 1996.